Percy Ingle was a retail bakery founded in east London in 1954, by Percy Ingle. The chain had over 50 outlets in London and Essex.

As of 2010, Michael and Paul Ingle, grandsons of the founder, were running the company.

On 22 June 2020, the Newham Recorder reported that the bakery was "due to close all its stores after 66 years". The paper reported that "head office has confirmed the closure", but that "an official statement is yet to be released".

References

External links
 Percy Ingle website 
 British Pathe Film showing Percy Ingle

Bakeries of the United Kingdom
British companies established in 1954
Defunct retail companies of the United Kingdom
Fast-food chains of the United Kingdom
Food and drink companies established in 1954
Retail companies established in 1954